The 2011 ICC Under-19 Cricket World Cup Qualifier was an event organised by the International Cricket Council held in Ireland in July, 2011. Ten participants competed for the six remaining places in the 2012 ICC Under-19 Cricket World Cup.

Teams

Two teams from each of the five ICC regions enter the World Cup Qualifier. All ten teams have been determined through regional tournaments.

 (2010 Africa U-19 Championships)
 (2010 Africa U-19 Championships)
 (2010 European U-19 Division One)
 (2010 European U-19 Division One)
 (2011 ACC U-19 Elite Cup Champion)
 (2011 ACC U-19 Elite Cup Runner Up)
 (2011 East Asia Pacific Under 19 Championship)
 (2011 East Asia Pacific Under 19 Championship)
 (2011 Americas Under 19 Division 1)
 (2011 Americas Under 19 Division 1)

Matches
All the matches of the tournament played in Ireland. Here is the list of matches that were played during the tournament.

Final table
This was how the final table looked like. The top 6 teams of the tournament qualified for the 2012 U-19 Cricket World Cup.

References

Qualifier
2011 in cricket
2011 in Irish cricket
Qualification for cricket competitions
International cricket competitions in Ireland